Clandestinotrema carbonera is a species of corticolous (bark-dwelling), crustose lichen in the family Graphidaceae. Found in Venezuela, it was formally described as a new species in 2018 by Ian Medeiros. The species epithet refers to the type locality – El Bosque La Carbonera-San Eusebio in the Venezuelan Andes. The species had previously been mentioned by lichenologist Mason Hale in a 1978 publication (as a species of Thelotrema), but he did not described it formally. This was the first reported instance of hypostictic acid isolated from a lichen.

Additionally, hypostictic acid is present as a major lichen product; stictic acid is a minor substance. Currently, the species has only been found in the type locality, which is an area of montane cloud forest near Mérida, Venezuela.

References

Graphidaceae
Lichen species
Lichens described in 2018
Lichens of Venezuela